A snow coach is a specialized passenger transport vehicle designed to operate over snow or ice, similar to a large, multi-passenger snowcat that is equipped with bus-style seating. These vehicles may have multiple sets of very large, low-pressure tires, or they may have tracks. Snow coaches may seat ten or more passengers and are often used for sightseeing tours or for over-snow transportation.

History
An early example of a snow coach was the Snow Bus built by Bombardier in Quebec, Canada. It was equipped with front skis and rear tracks and typically could seat 12 passengers. Alternatively, the front skis could be removed and replaced with front wheels. There are documented uses of the Bombardier Snow Bus being used as a school bus, for mail delivery, and as emergency vehicles. They were also used for tours and transportation in snowbound areas.

In the early 1960s, Thiokol produced the 601 series snowcats which were often configured to carry ten passengers. While not a tour bus type snow coach, these found utility with the United States Air Force as well as private industry.

Terra Bus
The Terra Bus wheeled vehicle is one of the few snow-coach-type vehicles currently produced. It is an all-wheel-drive, three-axle, off-road bus which is specially constructed for use in Arctic climates by the Canadian specialty vehicle manufacturer Foremost, based in Calgary.

The Terra Bus can transport up to 56 passengers. One Modified Terra Bus can be found transporting passengers at the Antarctic research station, McMurdo Station. Twenty-two unmodified Terra Buses can be found at the Columbia Icefield and at Jasper National Park, being operated by Brewster Co. for their Ice Explorer tour.

Specifications

Dimensions
Length: 
Height: 
Weight:
Curb weight: 24.95 tonnes
Maximum gross vehicle weight: 29.94 tonnes (33 Tons)

Performance
Engine:
Type: Detroit Diesel Series 50
Power: 250 hp (187 kW) at 2100 rpm
Transmission: Clark 34600 Series Power Shift 
Top speed: ,  on the Athabasca Glacier
Turning radius:

Operators
United States Antarctic Program
Brewster co. Tours

Uses
Snowcoaches are a popular mode of transportation for tourists in areas such as Yellowstone Park in the United States and the Columbia Icefield situated in Jasper National Park, Canada.

Snowcoaches can be outfitted with either a rubber track or a ski system (replacing tires). Often called by the brand name Mattracks, these rubber track systems can travel over thinner snow depths and even bare road patches without tearing up roadways. Metal-based ski systems can cause more damage or get stuck when traveling over snow-free patches. Subsequently certain roads may be restricted to just Mattrack-equipped snow coaches, based on road conditions.

Gallery

See also 

 Antarctic Snow Cruiser
 Bombardier Inc.
 Bombardier Recreational Products
 Kharkovchanka
 Logan Machine Company
 Sno-Cat
 Snowmobile
 Snow Trac
 Thiokol

References

External links 

  Foremost Industries Terra Bus Company Website
 Bombardier Snowmobiles JVBs snowmobiles still in commercial use
 Music video about a Terra bus, Lyrics

Tracked vehicles
Snowmobiles
Off-road vehicles
Land transport in Antarctica
Buses by type

ja:雪上車